Hurlstone Park railway station is located on the Bankstown line, serving the Sydney suburb of Hurlstone Park. It is served by Sydney Trains T3 Bankstown line services.

History
Hurlstone Park station opened on 1 February 1895 as Fern Hill when the Bankstown line opened from Sydenham to Belmore. It was renamed Hurlstone Park on 19 August 1911.

To the north of the station, lie two tracks that are part of the Metropolitan Goods line. The westbound line has a platform face, this was taken out of use when the Metropolitan Goods line was built in 1915.

Platforms and services

Transport links
Transit Systems operate two routes via Hurlstone Park station:
406: Hurlstone Park to Five Dock
418: Westfield Burwood to Sydenham

References

External links

Hurlstone Park Station details Transport for New South Wales
Hurlstone Park Metro station Sydney Metro

Railway stations in Sydney
Railway stations in Australia opened in 1895
Bankstown railway line
City of Canterbury-Bankstown